The Shanghai Urban Planning Exhibition Center  is located on People's Square, Shanghai, adjacent to the municipal government building.

The Exhibition Center is a six-story building, with two basement levels, which displays Shanghai's urban planning and development. The focus of the exhibit is a large scale model of the entirety of urban Shanghai, showing existing buildings and approved future buildings. Other exhibits relate to Shanghai's history and planned development, including smaller scaled models focussing on particular areas of interest such as the Bund. The Exhibition Center also has space for temporary exhibitions with a wide range of subject matter.

Building

The Exhibition Center was built as part of the re-development of parkland at the edge of People's Park and around People's Square in the 1990s and 2000s. The Park and Square together occupy what was once the Shanghai racecourse, and today still make up one of the largest open spaces in central Shanghai.

The building was designed by architect Ling Benli of the East China Architecture Design & Research Institute (ECADI), as a harmonious balance to the Grand Theatre, another contemporary building at the other end of People's Square.

Exhibits

The centerpiece of the exhibition is a huge scale model of the city of Shanghai, showing all existing and approved buildings. Visitors can view the model from alongside or ascend to a gallery running around it for views from above.

The model is intended to represent the entire city, including all planned developments. However, a few support pillars penetrate the scale model. This means certain areas are missing from the model, and some views of the model are obscured by the columns.

Alongside the model is a small theatre room housing a 360° screen. The room plays a video giving the impression the viewer is flying through the Shanghai of the future, viewing notable locations including some of the Shanghai Expo 2010 pavilions.

See also
Urban Planning Society of China
Panorama of the City of New York
Kirk A. Denton, Exhibiting the Past: Historical Memory and the Politics of Museums in Postsocialist China (University of Hawaii Press, 2014), pp. 250–56.

References

External links 

 

Buildings and structures in Shanghai
Culture in Shanghai
Architecture museums in China
Urban planning in China
2000 establishments in China
Museums in Shanghai
Urban planning museums
Huangpu District, Shanghai